Darwin's flycatcher or little vermilion flycatcher (Pyrocephalus nanus) is a species of flycatcher, closely related to the vermilion flycatcher. It is endemic to the Galápagos Islands. The same threats that led to the San Cristóbal flycatcher's extinction, including invasive species such as rats, threaten the Darwin's flycatcher today. Populations on the islands of Santa Cruz, Fernandina, Rabida and Isabela. It lives in humid forests and shrubland. They have an average lifespan of 5 years.

Taxonomy 
Darwin's flycatcher was described as full species Pyrocephalus nanus in 1839 by John Gould. It is recognized as a species by some taxonomic authorities, including the International Ornithologists' Union. Others — including the taxonomists behind the Howard and Moore checklist and the Clements checklist — still consider it to be a subspecies of the vermilion flycatcher. it is locally extinct on Floreana Island, close to extinction on Santa Cruz island and under threat on Isabela island.

A 2016 study on the vermilion flycatcher elevated several of the subspecies to the rank of species, including Darwin's flycatcher, and the now extinct San Cristόbal flycatcher.

Description 
The males have a striking red plumage, with black wings and eye markings. They have an average size of about 13 centimeters and have an average weight of about 12 grams, the maximum of both the size and weight is unknown.

References

Darwin's flycatcher
Darwin's flycatcher
Darwin's flycatcher